Günter Herz (born 1940) is a German businessman, former CEO of the German coffee shop and retail chain Tchibo.

Early life
Günter Herz is the son of Max Herz and Ingeburg Herz. Max Herz co-founded Tchibo in 1949 with Carl Tchilinghiryan.

Career
Tchibo is 100% owned by three members of the Herz family, Ingeburg Herz (Max Herz's widow), and two of her sons, Michael and Wolfgang Herz. In 2003, they bought out their brother, Günter, and sister, Daniela Herz-Schnoekel's 40% stake. In 2008, their brother Joachim died in a motorboat accident.

According to Forbes, Herz has a net worth of $2.8 billion, as of May 2015.

Personal life
Herz is married with two children, and lives in Hamburg.

References 

Living people
1940 births
German billionaires
Gunter
20th-century German businesspeople
21st-century German businesspeople
German businesspeople in retailing